Indoor air quality (IAQ) is the air quality within and around buildings and structures. IAQ is known to affect the health, comfort, and well-being of building occupants. Poor indoor air quality has been linked to sick building syndrome, reduced productivity, and impaired learning in schools. Common pollutants of indoor air include: Secondhand tobacco smoke, air pollutants from indoor combustion, radon, molds and other allergens, carbon monoxide, volatile organic compounds, legionella and other bacteria, asbestos fibers, carbon dioxide, ozone and particulates. Source control, filtration, and the use of ventilation to dilute contaminants are the primary methods for improving indoor air quality in most buildings. 

Determination of IAQ involves the collection of air samples, monitoring human exposure to pollutants, collection of samples on building surfaces, and computer modelling of air flow inside buildings. IAQ is part of indoor environmental quality (IEQ), which includes IAQ as well as other physical and psychological aspects of life indoors (e.g., lighting, visual quality, acoustics, and thermal comfort).

Indoor workplaces are found in many working environments such as offices, sales areas, hospitals, libraries, schools and preschool childcare facilities. At such workplaces, no tasks involving hazardous substances are performed, and they do not include high-noise areas. Nevertheless, employees may feature symptoms belonging to the sick building syndrome such as burning of the eyes, scratchy throat, blocked nose, and headaches. These afflictions often cannot be attributed to a single cause, and require a comprehensive analysis besides the testing of the air quality. Factors such as the workplace design, lighting, noise, thermal environment, ionising radiation and psychological and mental aspects have as well to be allowed for. A report assisted by the Institute for Occupational Safety and Health of the German Social Accident Insurance can support in the systematic investigation of individual health problems arising at indoor workplaces, and in the identification of practical solutions.

Indoor air pollution is a major health hazard in developing countries and is commonly referred to as "household air pollution" in that context. It is mostly relating to cooking and heating methods by burning biomass fuel, in the form of wood, charcoal, dung, and crop residue, in indoor environments that lack proper ventilation. Millions of people, primarily women and children face serious health risks. In total, about three billion people in developing countries are affected by this problem. The World Health Organization (WHO) estimates that cooking-related indoor air pollution causes 3.8 million annual deaths. The Global Burden of Disease study estimated the number of deaths in 2017 at 1.6 million.

In January 2023, suggestions for decreasing indoor air pollution when using a gas stove, which is linked to an increased risk of asthma and other possible illnesses, were published in The New York Times.

Common pollutants

Secondhand tobacco smoke

Secondhand smoke is tobacco smoke which affects people other than the 'active' smoker.  Second-hand tobacco smoke includes both a gaseous and a particulate phase, with particular hazards arising from levels of carbon monoxide (as indicated below) and very small particulates (fine particular matter at especially PM2.5 size, and PM10) which get into the bronchioles and alveoles in the lung. The only certain method to improve indoor air quality as regards secondhand smoke is to eliminate smoking indoors. Indoor e-cigarette use also increases home particulate matter concentrations.

Air pollutants from indoor combustion

Indoor combustion, such as for cooking or heating, is a major cause of indoor air pollution and causes significant health harms and premature deaths. Hydrocarbon fires cause air pollution. Pollution is caused by both biomass and fossil fuels of various types, but some forms of fuels are more harmful than others. Indoor fire can produce black carbon particles, nitrogen oxides, sulfur oxides, and mercury compounds, among other emissions. Around 3 billion people cook over open fires or on rudimentary cook stoves. Cooking fuels are coal, wood, animal dung, and crop residues.

In January 2023, ways of improving indoor air pollution when using a gas stove, linked to an increased risk of asthma and other possible illnesses, was published in The New York Times.

Radon

Radon is an invisible, radioactive atomic gas that results from the radioactive decay of radium, which may be found in rock formations beneath buildings or in certain building materials themselves.  Radon is probably the most pervasive serious hazard for indoor air in the United States and Europe, and is probably responsible for tens of thousands of deaths from lung cancer each year. There are relatively simple test kits for do-it-yourself radon gas testing, but if a home is for sale the testing must be done by a licensed person in some U.S. states. Radon gas enters buildings as a soil gas and is a heavy gas and thus will tend to accumulate at the lowest level. Radon may also be introduced into a building through drinking water particularly from bathroom showers. Building materials can be a rare source of radon, but little testing is carried out for stone, rock or tile products brought into building sites; radon accumulation is greatest for well insulated homes. The half life for radon is 3.8 days, indicating that once the source is removed, the hazard will be greatly reduced within a few weeks. Radon mitigation methods include sealing concrete slab floors, basement foundations, water drainage systems, or by increasing ventilation. They are usually cost effective and can greatly reduce or even eliminate the contamination and the associated health risks.

Radon is measured in picocuries per liter of air (pCi/L), a measurement of radioactivity. In the United States, the average indoor radon level is about 1.3 pCi/L. The average outdoor level is about 0.4 pCi/L. The U.S. Surgeon General and EPA recommend fixing homes with radon levels at or above 4 pCi/L. EPA also recommends that people think about fixing their homes for radon levels between 2 pCi/L and 4 pCi/L.

Molds and other allergens

These biological chemicals can arise from a host of means, but there are two common classes: (a) moisture induced growth of mold colonies and (b) natural substances released into the air such as animal dander and plant pollen. Mold is always associated with moisture, and its growth can be inhibited by keeping humidity levels below 50%. Moisture buildup inside buildings may arise from water penetrating compromised areas of the building envelope or skin, from plumbing leaks, from condensation due to improper ventilation, or from ground moisture penetrating a building part. Even something as simple as drying clothes indoors on radiators can increase the risk of exposure to (amongst other things) Aspergillus – a highly dangerous mould that can be fatal for asthma sufferers and the elderly. In areas where cellulosic materials (paper and wood, including drywall) become moist and fail to dry within 48 hours, mold mildew can propagate and release allergenic spores into the air.

In many cases, if materials have failed to dry out several days after the suspected water event, mold growth is suspected within wall cavities even if it is not immediately visible. Through a mold investigation, which may include destructive inspection, one should be able to determine the presence or absence of mold. In a situation where there is visible mold and the indoor air quality may have been compromised, mold remediation may be needed. Mold testing and inspections should be carried out by an independent investigator to avoid any conflict of interest and to insure accurate results.

There are some varieties of mold that contain toxic compounds (mycotoxins). However, exposure to hazardous levels of mycotoxin via inhalation is not possible in most cases, as toxins are produced by the fungal body and are not at significant levels in the released spores. The primary hazard of mold growth, as it relates to indoor air quality, comes from the allergenic properties of the spore cell wall. More serious than most allergenic properties is the ability of mold to trigger episodes in persons that already have asthma, a serious respiratory disease.

Carbon monoxide
One of the most acutely toxic indoor air contaminants is carbon monoxide (CO), a colourless and odourless gas that is a by-product of incomplete combustion. Common sources of carbon monoxide are tobacco smoke, space heaters using fossil fuels, defective central heating furnaces and automobile exhaust. By depriving the brain of oxygen, high levels of carbon monoxide can lead to nausea, unconsciousness and death. According to the American Conference of Governmental Industrial Hygienists (ACGIH), the time-weighted average (TWA) limit for carbon monoxide (630–08–0) is 25 ppm.

Volatile organic compounds
Volatile organic compounds (VOCs) are emitted as gases from certain solids or liquids. VOCs include a variety of chemicals, some of which may have short- and long-term adverse health effects. Concentrations of many VOCs are consistently higher indoors (up to ten times higher) than outdoors.  VOCs are emitted by a wide array of products numbering in the thousands. Examples include: paints and lacquers, paint strippers, cleaning supplies, pesticides, building materials and furnishings, office equipment such as copiers and printers, correction fluids and carbonless copy paper, graphics and craft materials including glues and adhesives, permanent markers, and photographic solutions.

Chlorinated drinking water releases chloroform when hot water is used in the home.  Benzene is emitted from fuel stored in attached garages. Overheated cooking oils emit acrolein and formaldehyde. A meta-analysis of 77 surveys of VOCs in homes in the US found the top ten riskiest indoor air VOCs were acrolein, formaldehyde, benzene,  hexachlorobutadiene, acetaldehyde, 1,3-butadiene, benzyl chloride, 1,4-dichlorobenzene, carbon tetrachloride, acrylonitrile, and vinyl chloride.  These compounds exceeded health standards in most homes.

Organic chemicals are widely used as ingredients in household products. Paints, varnishes, and wax all contain organic solvents, as do many cleaning, disinfecting, cosmetic, degreasing, and hobby products. Fuels are made up of organic chemicals. All of these products can release organic compounds during usage, and, to some degree, when they are stored. Testing emissions from building materials used indoors has become increasingly common for floor coverings, paints, and many other important indoor building materials and finishes.

Indoor materials such as gypsum boards or carpet act as VOC 'sinks', by trapping VOC vapors for extended periods of time, and releasing them by outgassing. This can result in chronic and low-level exposures to VOCs.

Several initiatives envisage to reduce indoor air contamination by limiting VOC emissions from products. There are regulations in France and in Germany, and numerous voluntary ecolabels and rating systems containing low VOC emissions criteria such as EMICODE, M1, Blue Angel and Indoor Air Comfort in Europe, as well as California Standard CDPH Section 01350 and several others in the US. These initiatives changed the marketplace where an increasing number of low-emitting products has become available during the last decades.

At least 18 Microbial VOCs (MVOCs) have been characterised including 1-octen-3-ol, 3-methylfuran, 2-pentanol, 2-hexanone, 2-heptanone, 3-octanone, 3-octanol, 2-octen-1-ol, 1-octene, 2-pentanone, 2-nonanone, borneol, geosmin, 1-butanol, 3-methyl-1-butanol, 3-methyl-2-butanol, and thujopsene.  The first of these compounds is called mushroom alcohol.  The last four are products of Stachybotrys chartarum, which has been linked with sick building syndrome.

Legionella
Legionnaires' disease is caused by a waterborne bacterium Legionella that grows best in slow-moving or still, warm water. The primary route of exposure is through the creation of an aerosol effect, most commonly from evaporative cooling towers or showerheads. A common source of Legionella in commercial buildings is from poorly placed or maintained evaporative cooling towers, which often release water in an aerosol which may enter nearby ventilation intakes. Outbreaks in medical facilities and nursing homes, where patients are immuno-suppressed and immuno-weak, are the most commonly reported cases of Legionellosis. More than one case has involved outdoor fountains in public attractions. The presence of Legionella in commercial building water supplies is highly under-reported, as healthy people require heavy exposure to acquire infection.

Legionella testing typically involves collecting water samples and surface swabs from evaporative cooling basins, shower heads, faucets/taps, and other locations where warm water collects. The samples are then cultured and colony forming units (cfu) of Legionella are quantified as cfu/Liter.

Legionella is a parasite of protozoans such as amoeba, and thus requires conditions suitable for both organisms. The bacterium forms a biofilm which is resistant to chemical and antimicrobial treatments, including chlorine. Remediation for Legionella outbreaks in commercial buildings vary, but often include very hot water flushes (160 °F; 70 °C), sterilisation of standing water in evaporative cooling basins, replacement of shower heads, and in some cases flushes of heavy metal salts. Preventive measures include adjusting normal hot water levels to allow for 120 °F (50 °C) at the tap, evaluating facility design layout, removing faucet aerators, and periodic testing in suspect areas.

Other bacteria
There are many bacteria of health significance found in indoor air and on indoor surfaces. The role of microbes in the indoor environment is increasingly studied using modern gene-based analysis of environmental samples. Currently efforts are under way to link microbial ecologists and indoor air scientists to forge new methods for analysis and to better interpret the results.

"There are approximately ten times as many bacterial cells in the human flora as there are human cells in the body, with large numbers of bacteria on the skin and as gut flora." A large fraction of the bacteria found in indoor air and dust are shed from humans. Among the most important bacteria known to occur in indoor air are Mycobacterium tuberculosis, Staphylococcus aureus, Streptococcus pneumoniae.

Asbestos fibers
Many common building materials used before 1975 contain asbestos, such as some floor tiles, ceiling tiles, shingles, fireproofing, heating systems, pipe wrap, taping muds, mastics, and other insulation materials. Normally, significant releases of asbestos fiber do not occur unless the building materials are disturbed, such as by cutting, sanding, drilling, or building remodelling. Removal of asbestos-containing materials is not always optimal because the fibers can be spread into the air during the removal process. A management program for intact asbestos-containing materials is often recommended instead.

When asbestos-containing material is damaged or disintegrates, microscopic fibers are dispersed into the air. Inhalation of asbestos fibers over long exposure times is associated with increased incidence of lung cancer, in particular the specific form mesothelioma. The risk of lung cancer from inhaling asbestos fibers is significantly greater to smokers, however there is no confirmed connection to damage caused by asbestosis  . The symptoms of the disease do not usually appear until about 20 to 30 years after the first exposure to asbestos.

Asbestos is found in older homes and buildings, but occurs most commonly in schools, hospitals and industrial settings. Although all asbestos is hazardous, products that are friable, e.g. sprayed coatings and insulation, pose a significantly higher hazard as they are more likely to release fibers to the air. The US Federal Government and some states have set standards for acceptable levels of asbestos fibers in indoor air. There are particularly stringent regulations applicable to schools.

Carbon dioxide
According to ASHRAE, "Existing evidence for direct impacts of Carbon dioxide (CO2) on health, well-being, learning outcomes, and work performance at commonly observed indoor concentrations is inconsistent, and therefore does not currently justify changes to ventilation and IAQ standards, regulations, or guidelines." NASA noted research on the CO2 levels found on submarines or spacecraft (of 3000ppm-7000ppm) had found it didn't affect the performance of astronauts or submarine officers. However, they decided to limit it to 5000ppm to avoid headaches. Whereas in non-specialised populations, pure CO2 at a concentration common in indoor environments was found to affect high-level decision-making. 

Moreover, it  is a relatively easy to measure surrogate for indoor pollutants emitted by humans, and correlates with human metabolic activity. Humans are the main indoor source of carbon dioxide in most buildings. Indoor CO2 levels are an indicator of the adequacy of outdoor air ventilation relative to indoor occupant density and metabolic activity.
To eliminate most complaints, the total indoor CO2 level should be reduced to a difference of no greater than 700 ppm above outdoor levels. The USA National Institute for Occupational Safety and Health (NIOSH) considers that indoor air concentrations of carbon dioxide that exceed 1,000 ppm are a marker suggesting inadequate ventilation. The UK standards for schools say that carbon dioxide in all teaching and learning spaces, when measured at seated head height and averaged over the whole day should not exceed 1,500 ppm. The whole day refers to normal school hours (i.e. 9:00am to 3:30pm) and includes unoccupied periods such as lunch breaks. In Hong Kong, the EPD established indoor air quality objectives for office buildings and public places in which a carbon dioxide level below 1,000 ppm is considered to be good. European standards limit carbon dioxide to 3,500 ppm. OSHA limits carbon dioxide concentration in the workplace to 5,000 ppm for prolonged periods, and 35,000 ppm for 15 minutes.

Carbon dioxide concentrations increase as a result of human occupancy, but lag in time behind cumulative occupancy and intake of fresh air. The lower the air exchange rate, the slower the buildup of carbon dioxide to quasi "steady state" concentrations on which the NIOSH and UK guidance are based.  Therefore, measurements of carbon dioxide for purposes of assessing the adequacy of ventilation need to be made after an extended period of steady occupancy and ventilation – in schools at least 2 hours, and in offices at least 3 hours – for concentrations to be a reasonable indicator of ventilation adequacy. Portable instruments used to measure carbon dioxide should be calibrated frequently, and outdoor measurements used for calculations should be made close in time to indoor measurements. Corrections for temperature effects on measurements made outdoors may also be necessary.

Carbon dioxide concentrations in closed or confined rooms can increase to 1,000 ppm within 45 minutes of enclosure. For example, in a  sized office, atmospheric carbon dioxide increased from 500 ppm to over 1,000 ppm within 45 minutes of ventilation cessation and closure of windows and doors.

Ozone 
Ozone is produced by ultraviolet light from the Sun hitting the Earth's atmosphere (especially in the ozone layer), lightning, certain high-voltage electric devices (such as air ionizers), and as a by-product of other types of pollution.

Ozone exists in greater concentrations at altitudes commonly flown by passenger jets.  Reactions between ozone and onboard substances, including skin oils and cosmetics, can produce toxic chemicals as by-products.  Ozone itself is also irritating to lung tissue and harmful to human health.

Outdoor air used for ventilation may have sufficient ozone to react with common indoor pollutants as well as skin oils and other common indoor air chemicals or surfaces. Particular concern is warranted when using "green" cleaning products based on citrus or terpene extracts, because these chemicals react very quickly with ozone to form toxic and irritating chemicals as well as fine and ultrafine particles.  Ventilation with outdoor air containing elevated ozone concentrations may complicate remediation attempts.

The Clean Air Act of 1990 required the United States Environmental Protection Agency to set National Ambient Air Quality Standards (NAAQS) for six criteria air pollutants harmful to human health. Ozone is one of the criteria air pollutants.  Other organizations have put forth air standards such as the Occupational Safety and Health Administration (OSHA), the National Institute for Occupational Safety and Health (NIOSH), and the World Health Organization (WHO). The OSHA standard for Ozone concentration within the workplace is 0.1 ppm averaged over an 8-hour period. The EPA standard for ozone concentration is 0.07 ppm average over an 8-hour period.

Particulates 
Atmospheric particulate matter, also known as particulates, can be found indoors and can affect the health of occupants.  Authorities have established standards for the maximum concentration of particulates to ensure indoor air quality.

Prompt cognitive deficits
In 2015, experimental studies reported the detection of significant episodic (situational) cognitive impairment from impurities in the air breathed by test subjects who were not informed about changes in the air quality. Researchers at the Harvard University and SUNY Upstate Medical University and Syracuse University measured the cognitive performance of 24 participants in three different controlled laboratory atmospheres that simulated those found in "conventional" and "green" buildings, as well as green buildings with enhanced ventilation. Performance was evaluated objectively using the widely used Strategic Management Simulation software simulation tool, which is a well-validated assessment test for executive decision-making in an unconstrained situation allowing initiative and improvisation. Significant deficits were observed in the performance scores achieved in increasing concentrations of either VOCs or carbon dioxide, while keeping other factors constant. The highest impurity levels reached are not uncommon in some classroom or office environments.

Effect of indoor plants 

Houseplants together with the medium in which they are grown can reduce components of indoor air pollution, particularly volatile organic compounds (VOC) such as benzene, toluene, and xylene. Plants remove CO2 and release oxygen and water, although the quantitative impact for house plants is small. The interest in using potted plants for removing VOCs was sparked by a 1989 NASA study conducted in sealed chambers designed to replicate the environment on space stations. However, these results suffered from poor replication and are not applicable to typical buildings, where outdoor-to-indoor air exchange already removes VOCs at a rate that could only be matched by the placement of 10–1000 plants/m2 of a building’s floor space.

Plants also appear to reduce airborne microbes and molds, and to increase humidity. However, the increased humidity can itself lead to increased levels of mold and even VOCs.

When carbon dioxide concentrations are elevated indoors relative to outdoor concentrations, it is only an indicator that ventilation is inadequate to remove metabolic products associated with human occupancy. Plants require carbon dioxide to grow and release oxygen when they consume carbon dioxide.  A study published in the journal Environmental Science & Technology considered uptake rates of ketones and aldehydes by the peace lily (Spathiphyllum clevelandii) and golden pothos (Epipremnum aureum) Akira Tani and C. Nicholas Hewitt found "Longer-term fumigation results revealed that the total uptake amounts were 30–100 times as much as the amounts dissolved in the leaf, suggesting that volatile organic carbons are metabolized in the leaf and/or translocated through the petiole." It is worth noting the researchers sealed the plants in Teflon bags. "No VOC loss was detected from the bag when the plants were absent. However, when the plants were in the bag, the levels of aldehydes and ketones both decreased slowly but continuously, indicating removal by the plants." Studies done in sealed bags do not faithfully reproduce the conditions in the indoor environments of interest. Dynamic conditions with outdoor air ventilation and the processes related to the surfaces of the building itself and its contents as well as the occupants need to be studied.

Since extremely high humidity is associated with increased mold growth, allergic responses, and respiratory responses, the presence of additional moisture from houseplants may not be desirable in all indoor settings if watering is done inappropriately.

HVAC design

Environmentally sustainable design concepts also include aspects related to the commercial and residential heating, ventilation and air-conditioning (HVAC) industry. Among several considerations, one of the topics attended to is the issue of indoor air quality throughout the design and construction stages of a building's life.

One technique to reduce energy consumption while maintaining adequate air quality, is demand-controlled ventilation.  Instead of setting throughput at a fixed air replacement rate, carbon dioxide sensors are used to control the rate dynamically, based on the emissions of actual building occupants.

For the past several years, there have been many debates among indoor air quality specialists about the proper definition of indoor air quality and specifically what constitutes "acceptable" indoor air quality.

One way of quantitatively ensuring the health of indoor air is by the frequency of effective turnover of interior air by replacement with outside air.  In the UK, for example, classrooms are required to have 2.5 outdoor air changes per hour.  In halls, gym, dining, and physiotherapy spaces, the ventilation should be sufficient to limit carbon dioxide to 1,500 ppm. In the US, and according to ASHRAE Standards, ventilation in classrooms is based on the amount of outdoor air per occupant plus the amount of outdoor air per unit of floor area, not air changes per hour. Since carbon dioxide indoors comes from occupants and outdoor air, the adequacy of ventilation per occupant is indicated by the concentration indoors minus the concentration outdoors. The value of 615 ppm above the outdoor concentration indicates approximately 15 cubic feet per minute of outdoor air per adult occupant doing sedentary office work where outdoor air contains 385 ppm, the current global average atmospheric CO2 concentration. In classrooms, the requirements in the ASHRAE standard 62.1, Ventilation for Acceptable Indoor Air Quality, would typically result in about 3 air changes per hour, depending on the occupant density. Of course the occupants are not the only source of pollutants, so outdoor air ventilation may need to be higher when unusual or strong sources of pollution exist indoors. When outdoor air is polluted, then bringing in more outdoor air can actually worsen the overall quality of the indoor air and exacerbate some occupant symptoms related to outdoor air pollution. Generally, outdoor country air is better than indoor city air. Exhaust gas leakages can occur from furnace metal exhaust pipes that lead to the chimney when there are leaks in the pipe and the pipe gas flow area diameter has been reduced.

The use of air filters can trap some of the air pollutants.  The Department of Energy's Energy Efficiency and Renewable Energy section suggests that "[Air] Filtration should have a Minimum Efficiency Reporting Value (MERV) of 13 as determined by ASHRAE 52.2-1999."  Air filters are used to reduce the amount of dust that reaches the wet coils.  Dust can serve as food to grow molds on the wet coils and ducts and can reduce the efficiency of the coils.

Moisture management and humidity control requires operating HVAC systems as designed. Moisture management and humidity control may conflict with efforts to try to optimize the operation to conserve energy. For example, moisture management and humidity control requires systems to be set to supply make-up air at lower temperatures (design levels), instead of the higher temperatures sometimes used to conserve energy in cooling-dominated climate conditions. However, for most of the US and many parts of Europe and Japan, during the majority of hours of the year, outdoor air temperatures are cool enough that the air does not need further cooling to provide thermal comfort indoors. However, high humidity outdoors creates the need for careful attention to humidity levels indoors. High humidities give rise to mold growth and moisture indoors is associated with a higher prevalence of occupant respiratory problems.

The "dew point temperature" is an absolute measure of the moisture in air. Some facilities are being designed with the design dew points in the lower 50s °F, and some in the upper and lower 40s °F. Some facilities are being designed using desiccant wheels with gas-fired heaters to dry out the wheel enough to get the required dew points. On those systems, after the moisture is removed from the make-up air, a cooling coil is used to lower the temperature to the desired level.

Commercial buildings, and sometimes residential, are often kept under slightly positive air pressure relative to the outdoors to reduce infiltration.  Limiting infiltration helps with moisture management and humidity control.

Dilution of indoor pollutants with outdoor air is effective to the extent that outdoor air is free of harmful pollutants. Ozone in outdoor air occurs indoors at reduced concentrations because ozone is highly reactive with many chemicals found indoors. The products of the reactions between ozone and many common indoor pollutants include organic compounds that may be more odorous, irritating, or toxic than those from which they are formed. These products of ozone chemistry include formaldehyde, higher molecular weight aldehydes, acidic aerosols, and fine and ultrafine particles, among others. The higher the outdoor ventilation rate, the higher the indoor ozone concentration and the more likely the reactions will occur, but even at low levels, the reactions will take place. This suggests that ozone should be removed from ventilation air, especially in areas where outdoor ozone levels are frequently high. Recent research has shown that mortality and morbidity increase in the general population during periods of higher outdoor ozone and that the threshold for this effect is around 20 parts per billion (ppb).

Building ecology 
It is common to assume that buildings are simply inanimate physical entities, relatively stable over time. This implies that there is little interaction between the triad of the building, what is in it (occupants and contents), and what is around it (the larger environment). We commonly see the overwhelming majority of the mass of material in a building as relatively unchanged physical material over time. In fact, the true nature of buildings can be viewed as the result of a complex set of dynamic interactions among their physical, chemical, and biological dimensions. Buildings can be described and understood as complex systems. Research applying the approaches ecologists use to the understanding of ecosystems can help increase our understanding. “Building ecology“ is proposed as the application of those approaches to the built environment considering the dynamic system of buildings, their occupants, and the larger environment.

Buildings constantly evolve as a result of the changes in the environment around them as well as the occupants, materials, and activities within them. The various surfaces and the air inside a building are constantly interacting, and this interaction results in changes in each. For example, we may see a window as changing slightly over time as it becomes dirty, then is cleaned, accumulates dirt again, is cleaned again, and so on through its life. In fact, the “dirt” we see may be evolving as a result of the interactions among the moisture, chemicals, and biological materials found there.

Buildings are designed or intended to respond actively to some of these changes in and around them with heating, cooling, ventilating, air cleaning or illuminating systems. We clean, sanitize, and maintain surfaces to enhance their appearance, performance, or longevity.  In other cases, such changes alter buildings in ways that may be important to their own integrity or their impact on building occupants through the evolution of the physical, chemical, and biological processes that define them at any time. We may find it useful to combine the tools of the physical sciences with those of the biological sciences and, especially, some of the approaches used for ecosystems, in order to gain an enhanced understanding of the environments in which we spend the majority of our time, our buildings.

Institutional programs

The topic of IAQ has become popular due to the greater awareness of health problems caused by mold and triggers to asthma and allergies. In the US, awareness has also been increased by the involvement of the United States Environmental Protection Agency (EPA), which has developed an "IAQ Tools for Schools" program to help improve the indoor environmental conditions in educational institutions. The National Institute for Occupational Safety and Health conducts Health Hazard Evaluations (HHEs) in workplaces at the request of employees, authorized representative of employees, or employers, to determine whether any substance normally found in the place of employment has potentially toxic effects, including indoor air quality.

A variety of scientists work in the field of indoor air quality, including chemists, physicists, mechanical engineers, biologists, bacteriologists, and computer scientists.  Some of these professionals are certified by organisations such as the American Industrial Hygiene Association, the American Indoor Air Quality Council and the Indoor Environmental Air Quality Council. 

On the international level, the International Society of Indoor Air Quality and Climate (ISIAQ), formed in 1991, organises two major conferences, the Indoor Air and the Healthy Buildings series.

See also
 Air purifier
 Domed city
 Environmental management
 Healthy building
 Household air pollution
 Indoor bioaerosol
 Lead paint
 Microbiomes of the built environment
 Olfactory fatigue
 Phase I environmental site assessment
 Renovation

References

Sources 
 Monographs

 
 
 
 
 
 
 

 Articles, radio segments, web pages

 Apte, MG, et al., Outdoor ozone and building related symptoms in the BASE study, Indoor Air, 2008 Apr;18(2):156–70, cited by: National Center for Biotechnology Information, nih.gov.
 Bad In-Flight Air Exacerbated by Passengers, Talk of the Nation, National Public Radio, September 21, 2007.
 Indoor Air Pollution index page, United States Environmental Protection Agency.

External links
 US Environmental Protection Agency info on IAQ
 Best Practices for Indoor Air Quality when Remodeling Your Home, US EPA
 Addressing Indoor Environmental Concerns During Remodeling, US EPA
 Renovation and Repair, Part of Indoor Air Quality Design Tools for Schools, US EPA

Air pollution
Building biology
Industrial hygiene
Heating, ventilation, and air conditioning
Occupational safety and health
Pollution